Piergiuseppe Scardigli (October 13, 1933 - May 27, 2008) was an Italian medievalist and Germanic studies scholar. He was Professor of Germanic philology at the University of Florence. Scardigli specialized in the study early Germanic culture, literature and language.

Selected works
 Lingua e storia dei Goti, 1964

References
Patrizia Lendinara, Fabrizio D. Raschellà, Michael Dallapiazza (Hrsg.): Saggi in onore di Piergiuseppe Scardigli (= Jahrbuch für Internationale Germanistik. Band 105). Lang, Bern u. a.  2011,  (Biographische Data)

1933 births
2008 deaths
Germanic studies scholars
Italian medievalists
Italian philologists
Linguists of Germanic languages
Swedish philologists
Academic staff of the University of Florence
20th-century philologists